Burntime is a strategy/RPG video game for MS-DOS and Amiga produced by Max Design in 1993.

Plot
The game is set in a post-apocalyptic future, based on the three stages of every civilized society: ascent, heyday, and downfall. Burntime starts at the end of a flourishing civilization. The main goal of the game is to conquer the remaining habitable areas, as well as to survive.

Gameplay
To progress through this game the player must establish sources of food and water.  The player must then clear out hostiles and hire mercenaries to guard the location.  Armor can be found in the form of protective suits, and all elements of a suit must be collected for full protection.

There are three classes of mercenaries: doctors, technicians, and fighters. Fighters are good at defending areas and killing monsters. Technicians are needed to combine scrap items to produce working items (for example, wire, plus screws, plus a woodpile will produce a rat trap, a great source of food and income).  Finally, doctors will heal the player and his men if he keeps them over a period of time.

References

External links
Burntime at Lemon Amiga

1993 video games
Amiga games
Amiga 1200 games
DOS games
Europe-exclusive video games
Post-apocalyptic video games
Role-playing video games
Strategy video games
Survival video games
Video games developed in Austria